Jakku is a fictional desert planet in the Star Wars universe, first featured in the 2015 film The Force Awakens. Remote, lawless, and inhospitable, it is the homeworld of sequel trilogy main character Rey, played by Daisy Ridley, and Aftermath character Gallius Rax, both members of the Palpatine family. The film focuses on two distinct localities, Tuanul Village and Niima Outpost, near a starship graveyard.

The planet is also depicted in novels such as Chuck Wendig's Star Wars: Aftermath: Empire's End (2017).

Appearances

Film
The planet was first seen in the November 2014 teaser trailer for the first film of the Star Wars sequel trilogy, The Force Awakens (2015). The film's director and co-writer, J. J. Abrams, first mentioned its name at Star Wars Celebration in April 2015, identifying Jakku as the setting in the trailers and revealing that it is where the character Rey (Daisy Ridley) lives.

Jakku is a major setting in The Force Awakens and its novelization. The home world of main character Rey, it is a harsh and inhospitable desert planet on the outskirts of the Unknown Regions. In the film, Resistance X-wing pilot Poe Dameron (Oscar Isaac) comes to Jakku seeking vital information held by explorer Lor San Tekka (Max von Sydow). Poe is captured by the oppressive First Order but leaves the data behind with his astromech droid, . He escapes with the help of turncoat stormtrooper Finn (John Boyega), but Poe is presumed dead when their stolen TIE fighter crashes in the desert. Meanwhile,  befriends local scavenger Rey; pursued by the First Order, she and Finn flee Jakku with the droid aboard the Millennium Falcon. Later in the film, Rey has a vision of being left on the planet as a child and being taken by Unkar Plutt after touching Luke Skywalker's old lightsaber. 

The planet appears briefly in Star Wars: The Rise of Skywalker (2019). Rey has a flashback-like vision of her parents leaving her on the planet before they were killed. The planet also appears in a montage alongside Bespin and Endor after the film’s climactic battle on Exegol between the Resistance and the Sith Eternal; a burning Resurgent-class Star Destroyer can be seen falling behind an old Imperial-class Star Destroyer (one shown in The Force Awakens) as the galaxy rises up against the First Order. 

The scenes on Jakku were filmed in the UAE section of Rub al Khali desert, which falls under the jurisdiction of the Emirate of Abu Dhabi. In early concept development stages, the planet was conceived as a "junk planet" which would have "wreckage from the previous Star Wars movies". Unused designs for Tatooine by original trilogy concept artist Ralph McQuarrie were repurposed for exteriors. Some have criticized Jakku as being essentially the same planet as Tatooine, the home world of both Luke and Anakin Skywalker (from the original and prequel trilogy, respectively), with only its name being unique.

Literature
Jakku was first introduced in two novels released on September 4, 2015: Chuck Wendig's Star Wars: Aftermath (2015) and Claudia Gray's Lost Stars. The latter depicts some of the Battle of Jakku, the final confrontation between the forces of the Galactic Empire and the New Republic over the planet. The battle is also depicted in the final book in Wendig's Aftermath trilogy, Empire's End (2017), which explains that Palpatine kept an observatory on the planet to map the Unknown Regions, overseen by Palpatine's own adoptive son and Jakku native Gallius Rax, where in the event of his death, the Empire would reform as the First Order. The reference book The Force Awakens: The Visual Dictionary  establishes that this battle occurs one year and four days after the Battle of Endor depicted in Return of the Jedi, and is the last major stand of the Empire and battle of the Galactic Civil War. 29 years later, around the time of The Force Awakens, the debris field in the desert is called the Starship Graveyard.

Jakku appears or is mentioned in multiple other works, including Rey's Survival Guide (2015) and The Weapon of a Jedi (2015) by Jason Fry, and the 2015 short stories "High Noon on Jakku" (2015) and "All Creatures Great and Small" by Landry Q. Walker.

Video games
The 2015 action shooter video game Star Wars Battlefront features downloadable content (DLC) titled Battle of Jakku, which includes two multiplayer maps set on the planet. Jakku also features in the single-player campaign of the 2017 sequel, Star Wars Battlefront II, as well as a non-DLC multiplayer map titled Jakku: The Graveyard, with 4 different gamemode variants. Jakku is also a location in the two Lego-themed action-adventure video games; 2016's Lego Star Wars: The Force Awakens, and 2022's Lego Star Wars: The Skywalker Saga.

The planet is featured in a Lego Star Wars playset called Encounter on Jakku.

Theme park attraction
Jakku appears in the Disney Parks and Resorts attraction Star Tours – The Adventures Continue.

See also

 List of Star Wars planets and moons
 Desert planet

References

Fictional elements introduced in 2015
Star Wars planets
Fictional terrestrial planets
Fiction set on desert planets